The Autostrada Catania-Siracusa is a motorway 25 km long in eastern Sicily that connects the cities of Catania and Syracuse. It is part of the European route E45.

History
Completed in 2009, the motorway links the RA15 (Catania's bypass) to the SS114 main road to Syracuse. The northern part (12 km) of this stretch of new motorway, from the RA15 to the exit Ragusa-Lentini was opened 28 July 2009 and the remaining 13 km (Lentini-Augusta) were opened on 9 December 2009.

Catania-Augusta

Augusta – Syracuse

The motorway is connected to Siracusa through SS114, a dual carriageway that will need restyling before it can be upgraded to motorway, Then he becomes Siracusa-Ispica

Notes

Aut. CT-SR
Transport in Sicily